Schizopygopsis kessleri is a species of ray-finned fish endemic to China.

Named in memory or Russian ichthyologist Karl Federovich Kessler (1815-1881).

References 

Schizopygopsis
Freshwater fish of China
Endemic fauna of China
Taxa named by Solomon Herzenstein
Fish described in 1891